Triditarsus is a genus of daesiid camel spiders, first described by Carl Friedrich Roewer in 1933.

Species 
, the World Solifugae Catalog accepts the following two species:

 Triditarsus tarimensis Roewer, 1933 — China
 Triditarsus tibetanus Roewer, 1933 — China

References 

Arachnid genera
Solifugae